Blip enhancement is an electronic warfare technique used to fool radar. When the radar transmits a burst of energy some of that energy is reflected off a target and is received back at the radar and processed to determine range and angle. The reflected target energy is called skin return, and the amount of energy returning to the originating radar is directly proportional to the radar cross-section of the target. 

Basic radars present the target information on a display and displayed targets are referred to as blips. Based on the relative size of the blips on the display, a radar operator could determine large targets from small targets. When a blip enhancing technique is used, small targets returns are augmented to look like large targets. 

One early maritime application of this technique was used with an aircraft carrier and its escort ships. Because the aircraft carrier physically dwarfed the other vessels its radar return was much larger making it relatively easy for a radar operator to pick it out as a target. Escort ships were fitted with blip enhance transmitters that received and amplified the radar signal so that all of the escort ships looked like they were aircraft carrier-sized targets. When all the escort ships activated their blip enhance transmitters, all the ships blips grew on the radar display masking the true aircraft carrier blip, and confusing any attempt to target the aircraft carrier for a missile attack.

Electronic countermeasures
Radar